Actin, gamma 1 pseudogene 6 is a protein that in humans is encoded by the ACTG1P6 gene.

References

Further reading 

Pseudogenes